Field dog can refer to any kind of gun dog used to work a field, or more specifically:
Pointing dog, a dog used to point out game in a field
Flushing dog, a gun dog used to scare game out of hiding.